Colias heos is a butterfly in the family Pieridae. It is found in the East Palearctic (Altai to southern Siberia, Mongolia to Ussuri, southeastern China).

Description
C. aurora (heos) is a beautiful dark orange-red species. The veins are thinly black, being yellow however in the black marginal band. The hindwing is somewhat dusky, being again lighter before the black distal margin; the costa of the forewing is yellow, the moderately large middle spot of the forewing pale centred, the large orange-red middle spot of the hindwing contrasting with the ground. The underside of a beautiful yellow, with sparse markings, the black middle spot of the forewing pale centred, and that of the hindwing the colour of mother of pearl, edged with brownish, being sometimes double. The female has the ground colour orange red, or yellow, or white; the white females are named ab. chloe Eversmann; in the marginal band there are yellow spots, which are often united on the hindwing to form a band. decolorata Staudinger, from Dauria, is a lighter coloured local form.

Biology
The larva feeds on Vicia, Astragalus, Trifolium lucanicum

Subspecies
C. h. heos
C. h. alpina Verity, 1911 Altai, Sayan
C. h. semenovi Shtandel, 1960
C. h. thia Bang-Haas, 1934 "Kansu mer. occ., Meitschouan, Minschan. Anfang Juli- 2000 m"
C. h. vespera O. Bang-Haas, 1929 "Kansu, Gebirge bei Lantschou"

Taxonomy
Accepted as a species by Josef Grieshuber & Gerardo Lamas

References

External links
Global Butterfly Information System Images of C. h. heos
Global Butterfly Information System Images of C. h. thia Bang-Haas, 1934 "Kansu mer. occ., Meitschouan, Minschan. Anfang Juli- 2000 m"
Global Butterfly Information System Images of C. h. vespera Bang-Haas, 1927

Butterflies described in 1792
heos